Marc Gilbert de Varennes b.1591, d.1660, a Jesuit priest,  was a French writer on heraldry from the 17th century. He is best known for his large folio book Le roy d'armes ou L'art de bien former, charger, briser, timbrer, parer, expliquer, et blasonner les armoiries: Le tout enrichy de discours d'antiquitez, d'histoires, d'eloges, & d'vne grande quantité de blasons des armes de la pluspart des illustres maisons de l'Europe, & specialement de beaucoup de personnes de condition qui sont en France.  The 1st edition was printed in 1635. The second edition was published in Paris by Jean Billaine, in 1640.

References

External links
 

1591 births
1660 deaths
17th-century French Jesuits
18th-century French writers
18th-century French male writers